The National Insurance Academy (NIA Pune also known as NIA) is situated in Pune, India. Founded in 1980 by the Finance Department of the Indian government with capital patronage from LIC and public sector general insurance industry. NIA started MBA education as a lateral diversification from 2004 with Dr K C Mishra as the founder director and Dr R K Parchure as MBA Coordinator, who was soon replaced by Dr S D Totade. After the tenure of Dr K C Mishra, the academy had Dr. Prathap Oburai from IIM Ahmedabad as the new Director. During his stint here, Dr. Oburai had promised the students to elevate the academy to top 10 B-Schools of India with strong international collaborations. NIA runs a PGDM course. It provides a dual specialization (Insurance + Finance/Marketing/HR/IT).

A main source of income of the academy is arranged by IRDA in the form of Broker's training and examination programs. Also the MDP programme for top executives of insurance companies are a major contributor to funds generated by NIA.

Evolution of NIA 

NIA was functioning from Mumbai until 1990 and moved to its beautiful campus at Pune in the early 1990s. The academy is now an integrated management school with training, education, publications, research, consultancy and regulatory advisory services. Life Insurance, General Insurance, Reinsurance, Health Insurance, Crop Insurance, Credit Insurance, Pensions, Actuarial Services, Insurance Investment, Market research for insurance companies, developing insurance institutions and leadership for succession planning and Insurance regulatory compliance are the fields covered by the academy. The earlier Director (Late Dr. PS Palande - Retd Commissioner of Pune) had already positioned NIA on the international map. Later Kailash Chandra Mishra took over as the Director of the academy from 1999 and spearheaded the academy till August 2009.

Conceptual innovations 

The academy has developed 7A framework for the organizational structure of insurance, 7P framework for the underwriting structure of insurance and 7E framework for the value structure of insurance.

Institutional expansion 
Apart from the mother institution NIA, the academy houses an MBA program NIASoM, a producer development program (NIASPD), a pension research program (NIAPRI). NIA is also the statutory examining body for insurance brokers in India as per IRDA Regulation. The academy is home for historically famous Lloyd's Box symbolic of a Syndicate at old Lloyd's of London.

History of Lloyd's Box 
Lloyd's Box is essentially a set of historical Lloyd's Tables. The Lloyd's Box at National Insurance Academy was Michael Payne's box syndicate number 386. Michael Payne was a specialist Non-US liability underwriter at Lloyds. It was installed in the old Lloyds - it was unique as it was the only non-square underwriting desk in Lloyds.

While adorning 1952 Lloyd's building it was acquired in 1970 and the esteemed box became a feature of the underwriting room at Lloyds Gallery level in the early 1970s. When Lloyds moved to their new building in approximately 1987, it was purchased by Robert Porter the then managing director of E W Payne and installed in E W Payne's boardroom at 8 Bridge Street Sydney.

Significantly Rob Porter had brokered many pieces of Australian Liability business at that desk in the late 1970s and early 1980s; when relocated to Bridge street many good lunches were enjoyed by the mighty and powerful in insurance at it in the EW Payne board room.

"When removed from the 1952 Lloyds building the removal was overseen by the head waiter at the time who was delighted to know that it would continue service in Australia".

Rob Porter purchased the table by means of an offset brokerage deal between the QBE - E W Payne & Syndicate 386. The nominal value placed on it was AUD 25,000.

In 2006, this historical Lloyd's Box was presented to the then Director of National Insurance Academy (Dr K C Mishra) as Guru Dakshina (a teacher's dues) by the then Principal Officer of Marsh (Mr Sanjay Kedia), who is now its country head and MD.  It was originally housed in National Insurance Academy Museum at Greenleaf Dome, named after the former AT&T Chairman, who popularized the concept of "Servant Leadership". Later on this monumental table was shifted to a special room named after Mr B K Shah, one of the three legendary Indians, who ever entered into Insurance Hall of Fame at Ohio, United States. The other two being Sir Joseph Arnould and Mr G S Diwan in whose names also NIA has dedicated academic spaces like a lounge and Alumnia room respectively.

NIA School of Management

NIASoM is the Management School of National Insurance Academy in Pune, India.

Placements 

For the placement of 2011-13 batch all the four public sector general insurance companies came for the placement, GIC Re and AIC also came for the placement. The post offered in the public sector insurance companies were of A.O i.e.; administrative officer.

The 100% placement continues year after year.

Some of the companies who visited NIA SoM for placements are D.E. Shaw & Co., SAP Labs, HDFC Life, Accenture Services, SBI General, SBI Life, Bajaj Alliance General & Life Insurance Companies, AIR Worldwide, Infosys Limited, Cognizant Business Consulting, Swiss Re, GIC Re, Life Insurance Corporation of India (LIC), Wipro Technologies, Reliance General & Life Insurance, IFFCO Tokio General Insurance, ET Life Insurance, TCS, TATA-AIG General & Life, IndusInd Bank, Unit Trust of India Mutual Funds, Birla Sun Life Insurance, Kotak Life Insurance, IDBI Federal Life Insurance, Star Union Dai-chi, Max New York Life, Universal Sompo, GMR Group, HUL, Alliance Insurance Brokers, HCL Technologies, Tata CMC, ICICI Prudential, ICICI Lombard, Future Generali, HP, Aon, KM Dastur, Aegon Religare, Syntel, IBM, HDFC Ergo, Indiafirst Life Insurance, MetLife, ING Vysya, Marsh India Brokers, First Apex Technologies, Milliman Inc., L&T General Insurance, Raheja QBE, C2L Biz Solutions Private Limited, etc.

NAAC accreditation 

On 22 December 2007, National Assessment and Accreditation Council, an autonomous body of University Grants Commission (UGC), which is under the Ministry of HRD, Government of India assigned highest rating grade "A" for National Insurance Academy as an academic institution. As per results of accreditation cleared in 43rd Executive Committee Meeting held on 22 December 2007, National Insurance Academy has received the highest accreditation rating of NAAC which is "Grade A within cumulative grade point average range of 3.01 to 4 read as Very Good and Accredited" which is amplified as "high level of academic accomplishment as accepted of an institution" with the academy securing 3.43 Cumulative Grade Point Average (CGPA).

Institutional environment
National Insurance Academy (NIA), is located in Pune. It was established in the year 1980 under the aegis of Ministry of Finance Government of India, LIC, GIC and the four public sector insurance companies.  NIA is the jewel crafted by this one of a kind private public venture, and has been running executive development programs for the past 25 years.
Recently, National Insurance Academy School of Management(NIASoM) has undergone thorough management and syllabus restructuring following international standards under the supervision of Dr. Prathap Oburai, the Director of NIA. The institute has also revamped its assessment structure from a percentage based to a CGPA based grading system.

Research 

At research level NIASOM has established several instrumentalities. A journal "PRAVARTAK" is a research publication running in parallel to BIMAQUEST published by the parent institution National Insurance Academy. Dnyanajyoti Research Series (DJRS) is a research serial, which publishes occasional papers dealing with insurance and risk management. "Utkarsh" is another student publication focussing on learning issues, which students want to highlight in their own way. The PhD program revolves around Management, Insurance, Risk Management, Information Technology and Economics.

The academy conducts a nomination process to select a "C. D. Deshmukh Fellow" every year based on the excellence of past research recognized both by academia and insurance industry. Similarly for student researchers creating excellence in developing insurance laboratory project, an endowment is established by a former chairman of Life Insurance Company in early eighties known as the "A S Gupta" endowment.

In 2006, in recognition of its dedication for development of insurance laboratory, a historical Lloyd's Box was presented to the academy's director Dr K C Mishra by Marsh Brokers, which is now housed in the academy's Incubation Centre.

References

External links 
NIAPUNE

Educational institutions established in 1980
Education in Pune
Insurance in India
Insurance schools in India
Business schools in Maharashtra
1980 establishments in Maharashtra